The Estates General of 1600 was a parliamentary assembly of representatives of the constituent provinces of the Habsburg Netherlands.

It was the first, and only, estates general of the Netherlands convened under the authority of the Archdukes Albert and Isabella, who arrived in the Low Countries in 1599 as the new sovereigns, Philip II of Spain having bequeathed his territories in the Low Countries to his daughter Isabella as dowry upon her marriage to Albert.

The Estates General were summoned to recognise the sovereign authority of the Archdukes, and to raise taxes to pursue the war with the Dutch rebels.

Delegates
The delegates attending were as follows.

References

Historical legislatures in Belgium
16th-century elections
1600 in politics
1600 in the Habsburg Netherlands